Mazhdabad (also Romanized as Mazhdābād; also known as Mazdābād) is a village in Eshqabad Rural District, Miyan Jolgeh District, Nishapur County, Razavi Khorasan Province, Iran. At the 2006 census, its population was 306, in 83 families.

References 

Populated places in Nishapur County